Strathmore is a town located in southern Alberta, Canada that is surrounded by Wheatland County.

History 
The town began as a hamlet for the Canadian Pacific Railway (CPR) lines that were built in the area in 1883. The CPR named the town after one of its benefactors: Claude Bowes-Lyon, the Earl of Strathmore. The Earl's granddaughter, Queen Elizabeth – as consort to King George VI – later passed through the community on the "Royal Train" in late May 1939.

A track-laying record was made between Strathmore and Cheadle when the railway was built. In one hour one mile (1.6 km) of steel was laid and – at the end of the ten-hour working day – the rails were laid to Cheadle,  for a record. The passing of the Canadian government's Dominion Lands Act in 1872, encouraging settlement, led to increases in Strathmore's population and its importance as a rail supply stop.

Strathmore's first school opened in 1908. The CPR railway tracks are now gone, the land having been subdivided.

In 2011, the Town of Strathmore celebrated its centennial – and released the book 100 Years of Memories: Celebrating Strathmore’s Centennial through Polished Publishing Group in early 2012.

Demographics 

At its current population, Strathmore is one of the largest towns in the province and is eligible for city status. According to Alberta's Municipal Government Act, a town is eligible for city status when it reaches 10,000 residents.

Economy 

Today, the town is an important agricultural community. Oil and gas exploration is also a growing interest in the area. It is the headquarters of Golden Hills School Division No. 75.

Many residents commute daily from Strathmore to Calgary. In the 21st century, the town has seen a major growth in commercial development, with many franchise restaurants and a few big-box chain stores opening in the community.

Sports 

Strathmore was the home of the Strathmore Rockies, a team in the WWHL. It is currently home to the Strathmore Wheatland Kings of the Heritage Junior "B" league; as well as the UFA Bisons of the AMHL, who have helped produce NHL players Zach Boychuk and Mason Raymond among others.

The Strathmore Spartans football team has alumni players throughout the CJFL and Canadian University system.

The Strathmore Venom Junior "B" lacrosse team won the provincial title in 2010 for the first time since the team was founded in 2004.

Strathmore was one of the hosts for the 2013 Tour of Alberta Pro Cycling Festival.

Every year Strathmore holds its Heritage Days celebrations, which include the Strathmore Stampede, Canada's third largest rodeo.

Education 

Strathmore is part of the Golden Hills School Division.

Strathmore has four elementary schools (Wheatland, Westmount, Brentwood and George Freeman), one junior high school (Crowther Memorial Junior High School), one high school (Strathmore High School) and a Catholic School providing Kindergarten through grade 6 (Sacred Heart Academy) as well as a grade 7 to 12 Catholic school (Holy Cross Collegiate).

Strathmore was the home of Covenant Bible College Canada.  The CBC-C campus relocated in 1995 from its prior home in Prince Albert, Saskatchewan.  In Covenant Bible College, students took a course in religious studies.  It was closed in 2007 due to dropping student enrollment and other fiscal problems.  The former CBC campus was sold for $5.5 million to another Christian organization, EnCharis.

In September 2008, Trinity Christian Academy opened at the former Covenant Bible College property. Trinity Christian is a Christian school providing Kindergarten through grade 9 and is publicly funded.

See also 
List of communities in Alberta
List of towns in Alberta

References

External links 

1908 establishments in Alberta
Calgary Region
Towns in Alberta
Strathmore